KHL Medveščak Zagreb II, also known as KHL Medveščak Mladi Juniors, is a Croatian ice hockey team founded as the farm team of KHL Medveščak Zagreb. They play in the Croatian  Junior Ice Hockey League. Before they were senior champions in 2010, 2013, and 2014. They have also played in both the Panonian League and the Slohokej League.

History
 
Medveščak Zagreb II played in the 2003–04 Panonian League. At the end of the regular season they finished sixth out six teams and they failed to qualify for the play-offs. They made their debut in the Croatian Ice Hockey League in 2004–05, helping to make up the numbers in a depleted four-team league. During the 2009–10 season they played in both the Slohokej Liga and the CIHL, winning the latter title.

When the senior Medveščak team left the Croatian Ice Hockey League permanently to play initially in the Austrian Hockey League and later the KHL, their place in the CIHL was effectively filled by Medveščak II. The farm team has since won a further two national league titles. They won the 2013–14 title with the help of reinforcements from their senior team after they had been eliminated early from the 2014 Gagarin Cup playoffs.

Honours

 Croatian Ice Hockey League: 3
 2010, 2013, 2014

References

External links 
Croatian Ice Hockey Federation
 

Slohokej
Slohokej League teams
Croatian Ice Hockey League teams
Panonian League teams
Slovenian Ice Hockey League teams
Ice hockey clubs established in 2003
2003 establishments in Croatia